Michael Jephson, M.A. (b County Cork 9 May 1655 d 4 January 1693) was an Irish Anglican priest.

Jephson was educated at Trinity College, Dublin. He was Chaplain to Michael Boyle Archbishop of Armagh; Archdeacon of Leighlin from 1680 to 1683; Chancellor of Christ Church Cathedral, Dublin from 1683 to;
and  Dean of St. Patrick's Cathedral Dublin from 1691 until his death.

Notes

Alumni of Trinity College Dublin
Irish Anglicans
Deans of St. Patrick's Cathedral, Dublin
1693 deaths
1655 births
People from County Cork
Archdeacons of Leighlin